Thivandaran a/l Karnan (born 8 March 1999) is a Malaysian professional footballer who plays as a central midfielder for Penang.

Club career

Petaling Jaya City
On 2 March 2019, Thivandaran made his debut for Petaling Jaya City in a 0–1 defeat to Felda United.

International career
Thivandaran represented Malaysian at various youth levels. He was named in the Malaysia under 19 squad for 2018 AFF U-19 Youth Championship in the Indonesia. He has played in the final against Myanmar which Malaysia win 4–3.

Honours
Malaysia U19
 AFF U-19 Youth Championship: 2018

References

External links
 

1999 births
Living people
People from Penang
Malaysian footballers
Malaysian people of Tamil descent
Malaysian sportspeople of Indian descent
Association football midfielders
Malaysia Super League players
Malaysia Premier League players
Penang F.C. players
Petaling Jaya City FC players
Malaysia international footballers